The 2003 Vuelta a España was the 58th edition of the Vuelta a España, one of cycling's Grand Tours. The Vuelta began in Gijón, with a team time trial on 6 September, and Stage 12 occurred on 18 September with a stage from Cuenca. The race finished in Madrid on 28 September.

Stage 12
18 September 2003 — Cuenca to Albacete,

Stage 13
19 September 2003 — Albacete – Albacete,  (ITT)

Stage 14
20 September 2003 — Albacete to Valdepeñas,

Stage 15
21 September 2003 — Valdepeñas to La Pandera,

Stage 16
23 September 2003 — Jaén to Sierra Nevada,

Stage 17
24 September 2003 — Granada to Córdoba,

Stage 18
25 September 2003 — Las Rozas to Las Rozas,

Stage 19
26 September 2003 — Alcobendas to Collado Villalba,

Stage 20

Stage 21
28 September 2003 — Madrid to Madrid,

References

2003 Vuelta a España
Vuelta a España stages